Charles Paul Florimond Quef (1 November 1873, Lille – 2 July 1931, Paris) was a French organist and composer.

He studied at the conservatory in Lille, and later he attended the Paris Conservatory where he studied with Charles-Marie Widor, Louis Vierne and Alexandre Guilmant. From 1895 to 1898, he was organist of the Église Sainte-Marie-des-Batignolles and in 1898, organist of the Saint-Laurent church, Paris. In the same year, he was awarded the First prize for organ at the conservatory. Then he was appointed assistant organist and later, in November 1901, titular organist of the Église de la Ste.-Trinité, Paris, due to resignation of his predecessor Guilmant. He retained this post until his death in 1931.

External links
 

1873 births
1931 deaths
French composers
French male composers
French classical organists
French male organists
Conservatoire de Paris alumni
Musicians from Lille
Male classical organists